The Bengal Hawkers Association is a trade union of hawkers in West Bengal, India. It is affiliated with the Trade Union Coordination Centre. It was founded in 1950 and is the oldest hawkers' union in the state. It gained a strong following amongst refugees from East Pakistan.

References
 

Trade unions in India
Trade Union Coordination Centre
Trade unions in West Bengal
Retail trade unions
Organisations based in Kolkata
Street vendors
Trade unions established in 1950
1950 establishments in West Bengal